

Gmina Iłża is an urban-rural gmina (administrative district) in Radom County, Masovian Voivodeship, in east-central Poland.

Villages
Apart from the town of Iłża, Gmina Iłża contains the villages and settlements of Alojzów, Białka, Błaziny Dolne, Błaziny Górne, Chwałowice, Florencja, Gaworzyna, Jasieniec Iłżecki Dolny, Jasieniec Iłżecki Górny, Jasieniec-Maziarze, Jedlanka Nowa, Jedlanka Stara, Kajetanów, Kolonia Seredzice, Koszary, Kotlarka, Krzyżanowice, Małomierzyce, Maziarze Nowe, Maziarze Stare, Michałów, Nowy Jasieniec Iłżecki, Pakosław, Pastwiska, Pieńki, Piłatka, Piotrowe Pole, Płudnica, Prędocin, Prędocin-Kolonia, Seredzice, Seredzice-Zawodzie, Starosiedlice and Walentynów.

Neighbouring gminas
Gmina Iłża is bordered by the gminas of Brody, Ciepielów, Kazanów, Mirzec, Rzeczniów, Skaryszew and Wierzbica.

References
Polish official population figures 2006

Ilza
Radom County